

Events and publications

Year overall
EC Comics was established by Max Gaines.

January
 January 1: Debut of Dudley D. Watkins' Jimmy and his Magic Patch in The Beano.
 January 19: Marten Toonder's Tom Poes story De Superfilm-onderneming is first published. Halfway the story the antagonists Bul Super and Hiep Hieper make their debut. 
 Captain America Comics (1941 series) #34 - Timely Comics
 Human Torch Comics (1940 series) #14 - Timely Comics
 Marvel Mystery Comics (1939 series) #51 - Timely Comics
 U.S.A. Comics (1941 series) #11 - Timely Comics

February
 February 6: The first episode of Jacques Gagnier's La Vie en Images is published. It will run until 1944.
 February 10: The Italian comics magazine L'Audace is discontinued, after nearly ten years.
 Captain America Comics (1941 series) #35 - Timely Comics
 Marvel Mystery Comics (1939 series) #52 - Timely Comics
 Adventure Comics (Volume 1 1944) #90 -- DC Comics

March
 March 6: Debut of the long-running gag cartoon series This Funny World.
 Bomber Comics (March 1944) #1 . The issue marks the debut of Omar Tahan's Kismet, Man of Fate.
 Captain America Comics (1941 series) #36 - Timely Comics
 Marvel Mystery Comics (1939 series) #53 - Timely Comics
Young Allies Comics (1941 series) #11 - Timely Comics
Young Allies Comics (1941 series) #12 - Timely Comics

April
 April: First publication of Jon St. Ables' Brok Windsor.
 All-Winners Comics (1941 series) #12 - Timely Comics
 Captain America Comics (1941 series) #37 - Timely Comics
 Human Torch Comics (1940 series) #15 - Timely Comics
 Marvel Mystery Comics (1939 series) #54 - Timely Comics
 Sub-Mariner Comics (1941 series) #13 - Timely Comics
 U.S.A. Comics (1941 series) #12 - Timely Comics

May
 May 21: The first episode of André LeBlanc's Intellectual Amos is published.
 Captain America Comics (1941 series) #38 - Timely Comics
 Marvel Mystery Comics (1939 series) #55 - Timely Comics

June
 June 5: Frank Robbins' newspaper comic strip Johnny Hazard makes its debut.
 June 25: The death of George Herriman signifies the discontinuation of Krazy Kat after nearly 31 years.
 June 26: Debut of Jim McMenamy's newspaper comic Dotty Dripple, which will run until October, after which it will be continued by Buford Tune.
 June 28: In Frank King's Gasoline Alley Skeezix marries Nina Clock.
 Captain America Comics (1941 series) #39 - Timely Comics
 Marvel Mystery Comics (1939 series) #56 - Timely Comics
Young Allies Comics (1941 series) #13 - Timely Comics
 Dan Gordon's Superkatt makes his debut in issue #9 of Giggle Comics.

July
 July 1: The first episode of Hilda Terry's Teena is published. 
 Captain America Comics (1941 series) #40 - Timely Comics
 Contact Comics #1 - Aviation Press
 Marvel Mystery Comics (1939 series) #57 - Timely Comics
 Mystery Comics #3 - In this issue Lance Lewis, Space Detective makes his debut.
 U.S.A. Comics (1941 series) #13 - Timely Comics

August
 August 5: In issue #272 of the British comics magazine The Dandy Jack Glass' The Amazing Mr. X makes his debut. 
 August 13: Barbara Shermund publishes the first episode of her cartoon feature Shermund's Sallies, which will run in Pictorial Review until 2 June 1957.
 Captain America Comics (1941 series) #41 - Timely Comics

September
 September 10:: In a Sunday table of Hubie Karp and Bill Wright, first apparition of Grandma Goofy.   
September 23: The entire editorial staff of  Belgian newspaper Le Soir is arrested for Nazi collaboration. Hergé's Tintin story The Seven Crystal Balls, which ran in the paper, is discontinued and won't be resumed until 1946, albeit in the magazine Tintin. Hergé is jailed for a night, but freed again without any further charges. Nevertheless, he is unable to draw comics for about two years.
 September 30: In issue #30 of Superman recurring villain Mister Mxyzptlk makes his debut. .
All-Winners Comics (1941 series) #13 - Timely Comics
 Marvel Mystery Comics (1939 series) #58 - Timely Comics
Sub-Mariner Comics (1941 series) #14 - Timely Comics

October
 October 1: In Carl Barks' Donald Duck story Tight-Wire Walkers the city of Duckburg is first mentioned.
 October 5: The liberation of Belgium a year earlier lifts the Nazi ban on the Belgian comics magazine Spirou from a year earlier. The magazine now reappears in stores. Its main series Spirou et Fantasio is naturally continued and Spirou's sidekick Fantasio (a creation of Jijé) is now firmly established as a main cast member.
 October 16: Buford Tune takes over Jim McMenamy's family comic Dotty Dripple and will continue it for the next forty years.
 The Belgian comics magazine Bimbo also returns to the market, after being banned by the Nazis in 1943.
 Captain America Comics (1941 series) #42 - Timely Comics
Daring Comics (1940 series) #9 - Timely Comics (Daring Mystery Comics was renamed to Daring Comics)
 Human Torch Comics (1940 series) #16 - Timely Comics
 Marvel Mystery Comics (1939 series) #59 - Timely Comics
Miss America Comics #1 - Timely Comics
 U.S.A. Comics (1941 series) #14 - Timely Comics
 The first issue of the Belgian comics magazine Franc Jeu is published.

November
 November 16: 
 The first issue of the Argentine comics magazine Rico Tipo is published.
 Russian-Serbian comics artist Ivan Šenšin is executed at age 47 by a Communist firing squad on the incorrect suspicion of being a Nazi collaborator.
 November 18: Bulgarian cartoonist Rayko Aleksiev dies at age 51, after being brutally interrogated by officers of the newly established Communist regime.
 November 20: Marten Toonder cancels Tom Poes halfway a story in the newspaper De Telegraaf, after being informed that the new chief editor will be a member of the Dutch SS. He even asks a doctor to declare him "too manic depressive to continue working." The series will not be continued until 10 March 1947.
All-Winners Comics (1941 series) #14 - Timely Comics
Human Torch Comics (1940 series) #17 - Timely Comics
Sub-Mariner Comics (1941 series) #15 - Timely Comics

December
 December 24: Marc Sleen publishes his first adventure comic De Avonturen van Neus and a gag comic named Piet Fluwijn. The latter will prove to be more durable when a year later the new character Bolleke is introduced and the series will be renamed Piet Fluwijn en Bolleke.
 December 30: Marjorie Henderson Buell's newspaper comic Little Lulu comes to a close. 
 Captain America Comics (1941 series) #43 - Timely Comics
 Marvel Mystery Comics (1939 series) #60 - Timely Comics
Young Allies Comics (1941 series) #14 - Timely Comics

Winter 
 Blackhawk #9, taking over the numbering of Uncle Sam Quarterly — first issue of Blackhawk's own title (Quality Comics)
 Wonder Woman, volume 1, issue #11 (DC Comics). This also marks the debut of recurring villain Hypnota.

Births

January
 January 6: Claude Lacroix, aka Tartemption, Alias, French comics artist and illustrator (Farfelune, Yann Le Migrateur, Fariboles Sidérales, Cyann), (d. 2021).
 January 24: Robin Wood, Paraguayan-Argentine comics writer (Nippur de Lagash, Dago, Gilgamesh el inmortal,...), (d. 2021).

Deaths

January
 January 2: Orville Peter Williams, A.K.A. O.P. Williams, American comic artist (Gasoline Gus), dies at age 67.
 January 9: Döes, Swiss illustrator and comics artist, passes away at age 84 or 85.
 January 20: Arthur LeMay, Canadian caricaturist, illustrator and comics artist (continued Les Aventures de Timothée), passes away at age 43 or 44.
 Specific date unknown: Bernie Klein, American comics artist (worked for DC Comics, Quality Comics, Lev Gleason), dies in battle at age 23.

February
 February 4: Will B. Johnstone, American lyricist, screenwriter and comics artist (You Know Me Al), dies at age 62.
 February 27: Henri Cassiers, Belgian illustrator, poster artist and comics artist, passes away at age 85.

April
 April 6: Rose O'Neill, American comics artist, illustrator and novelist (Kewpies), dies at age 69 from paralysis and heart failure.
 April 25: George Herriman, American comics artist (Krazy Kat), passes away at age 63.

September
 September 2: Jan Feith, Dutch illustrator and comics artist (De Geschiedenis des Vaderlands), dies at age 80.
 September 13: William Heath Robinson, British cartoonist, passes away at age 72

October
 October 10: Antoni Utrillo, Spanish illustrator, writer, lithographer, painter, comics artist and poster designer (La Rondalla del Dijous), passes away at age 76 or 77.
 October 15: Melitón González, Spanish illustrator and comics artist, dies at age 89.
 October 21: Nell Brinkley, American illustrator and comics artist (Brinkley Girls), passes away at age 68.
 October 23: Gerrit Rotman, Dutch teacher and comics artist (Snuffelgraag en Knagelijntje, Meneer Pimpelmans), dies at age 51.
 Specific date unknown: Robert L. Dickey, American painter and comics artist (Mr. and Mrs. Beans, Buster Beans, Buckey and his Pals), passes away at age 82 or 83.

November
 November 16: Ivan Šenšin, Russian-Serbian comics artist (illegal Mickey Mouse comics, furthermore made comic strip adaptations of novels), is executed at age 47.
 November 18: Rayko Aleksiev, Bulgarian caricaturist, cartoonist, illustrator and comics artist, dies at age 51, after beaten up during interrogations.

December
 December 22: Louis Briault, British comics artist (The Comical Capers of Billie Reeves, the Scream of the Screen, The Psychic Trip), dies at age 59.

Specific date unknown
 Vlastimir Belkic, Yugoslavian comics artist (Hari Vilsa, illegal Mickey Mouse comics), dies at age 47 or 48.
 Paul Fung, American comics artist (Innocent Hing, A Guy from Grand Rapid, Big House Fables, Gus and Gussie, continued Dumb Dora), passes away at age 56 or 57.
 Lucien Laurent-Gsell, French painter, comics artist and illustrator, dies at age 83 or 84.
 Henry Thol, American comics artist (Adamson's Adventures), dies at age 57 or 58.

First issues by title
Miss America Comics cover dated October, published by Timely Comics

Initial appearances by character name
Gambler (comics) in Green Lantern #12 (June), created by Henry Kuttner and Martin Nodell - DC Comics
Giganta in Wonder Woman #9 (June), created by William Moulton Marston - DC Comics
Mister Mxyzptlk in Superman #30 (September) created by Jerry Siegel and Joe Shuster - DC Comics
Psycho-Pirate in All-Star Comics #23 (December), created by Gardner Fox and Joe Gallagher - DC Comics
Professor Carter Nichols in Batman #24 (August), created by Joe Samachson and Dick Sprang - DC Comics
Queen Clea in Wonder Woman #8 (March), created by William Moulton Marston - DC Comics
Solomon Grundy in All-American Comics #61 (October), created by Alfred Bester and Paul Reinman - DC Comics

References